Yifat Bitton is an Israeli Law professor, and activist. She is the president of the Achva Academic College of education & science. She is the founder of Tmura—The Israeli Anti-discrimination Center, which advocates for the rights of women who have suffered abuse. She was shortlisted for Israel's Supreme Court twice. In February 2019, Bitton entered politics, and joined Ehud Barak in the formation of a new political party .

Career 
From 1996–1997 Bitton clerked for Israeli Supreme Court Justice Mishael Cheshin. 
In 2006, Bitton founded Tmura—The Israeli Anti-discrimination Center, which advocates for women who have experienced sexual violence and violation of their economic rights. She is a civil rights activist, focusing on equality for the Mizrahi population.

Bitton was on the list of candidates for Israel's Supreme Court in 2017 and 2018, the youngest woman to ever appear on the list. She currently serves as the President of Achva academic college of education & science and in the past served as an associate professor at Israel's College of Management Academic Studies Law School. Prof. Bitton taught for 5 years as an Affiliated Transnational Visiting Professor at Peking University School of Transnational Law. She was also a visiting professor at New York University.

Politics
In February 2019, Bitton joined the Gesher party led by Orly Levy, receiving the third spot on the list. In the April 2019 Israeli legislative election, Gesher did not make it into the Knesset. Bitton joined Ehud Barak at a press conference in June 2019 announcing the formation of a new political party to challenge Benjamin Netanyahu in the September elections. The new party, Israel Democratic Party, joined other parties to create the Democratic Union list, with Bitton being placed seventh on  the joint list.

Education
Bitton spent the 2004–2005 academic year at Harvard Law. Bitton holds a PhD as well as an LLB and LLM from The Hebrew University of Jerusalem and a Master of Laws degree from Yale Law School.

Personal life
Bitton was born in Kiryat Malachi and lives in Herzliya. She is married to Eyal Sternberg, a lawyer, and they have two children.

Awards
Prof. Bitton has won myriad social and legal awards and prizes, among them: The Aliance Prize for Education and Social Change; The Minister of Social Equality and President's Award for Organizations Fighting Violence against Women (Tmura); "Honoris Causa" Award of the Israeli Bar Association; The Safra Award for Excellence and Contribution to Israeli Society; The Hadassah Foundation Bernice Tennenbaum Prize for innovative feminist; The Human Rights Activist Award of The London Human Rights Annual Dinner and Dafna Izraeli Fund’s Prize for Israeli Feminist Leadership.

Prof. Bitton was also Nominated Forbes' 50 Most Influential Women in Israel.

References

1971 births
Living people
20th-century Israeli lawyers
21st-century Israeli lawyers
21st-century Israeli women politicians
Academic staff of the College of Management Academic Studies
Harvard Law School alumni
Hebrew University of Jerusalem Faculty of Law alumni
Israeli activists
Israeli Jews
Israeli people of Moroccan-Jewish descent
Israeli people of Yemeni-Jewish descent
Israeli women academics
Israeli women activists
Israeli women judges
Israeli women lawyers
Jewish activists
Jewish Israeli politicians
Jewish women politicians
People from Kiryat Malakhi
Yale Law School alumni